Communist Party of Nepal (Maoist) may refer to:

 Communist Party of Nepal (Maoist) is the former name of the Communist Party of Nepal (Maoist Centre), until 2009.
 Communist Party of Nepal (Revolutionary Maoist), founded June 2012 
 Unified Communist Party of Nepal (Maoist), founded 2009
 Communist Party of Nepal (2014),  split from the Communist Party of Nepal (Revolutionary Maoist) in 2014; sometimes referred to as the "Communist Party of Nepal (Biplab)"
 Communist Party of Nepal (Maoist) (2012)